Stephen F. Austin State Park is a state park in Texas, United States and is located in San Felipe, Austin County, west of Houston on the Brazos River.

The  that makes up the site was deeded to the state by the San Felipe de Austin Corporation in 1940, and the park was opened to the public the same year.

 of the park are set aside as the San Felipe de Austin State Historic Site to honor the area's past. This was the site of the township of San Felipe, the seat of government of the Anglo-American colonies in Texas.  It was here Stephen F. Austin, brought the first 297 families to colonize Texas under a contract with the Mexican Government.  The town was burned on March 2, 1836, to prevent it from falling into the hands of the advancing Mexican Army during the Texas Revolution. On January 1, 2008, the San Felipe State Historic Site was transferred from the Texas Parks and Wildlife Department to the Texas Historical Commission.

The park is a productive birdwatching location.  White-tailed deer abound in the park. Habitat is typical East Texas riparian, upland areas are mostly pecan trees, while river bottom areas are dominated by cottonwoods and hackberry.

The park offers camping, a picnic area, hiking trails and a public golf course.

See also 
 List of Texas state parks
 List of Texas state historic sites

References

External links 
 Texas Parks and Wildlife: Stephen F. Austin State Park
 Texas Escapes - park history, information and photos

State parks of Texas
Texas state historic sites
Protected areas of Austin County, Texas